The third series of Waterloo Road, a British television school drama series created by Ann McManus and Maureen Chadwick and produced by BBC Scotland and Shed Productions, commenced airing in the United Kingdom on 11 October 2007 and concluded after 20 episodes on 13 March 2008.

Waterloo Road's third series aired in the United Kingdom on Thursdays at 8:00 pm GMT on BBC One, a terrestrial television network, where it received an average of five million viewers per episode.

Plot
The show follows the lives of the teachers and the pupils at the eponymous school of Waterloo Road, a failing inner-city comprehensive, tackling a wide range of issues often seen as taboo such as death, running away from home, prostitution, child grooming, HIV/AIDS, child abuse, homosexuality, Asperger syndrome, deportation, activism, blackmail, plagiarism and assault.

Premise
This series opened with headteacher Jack Rimmer (Jason Merrells) recording an emotional message for the entire school to hear, following the death of his colleague Izzie Redpath (Jill Halfpenny). Jack was witness to Izzie's stabbing at the end of Series 2, but it was previously unknown if she had died or not. 

Jack's second-in-command Andrew Treneman (Jamie Glover) was replaced by Eddie Lawson (Neil Morrissey), having accepted a teaching post in Rwanda alongside Kim Campbell (Angela Griffin) at the end of Series 2. Jack struggles to fulfil his role as headmaster this series, and later resigns when the school's board of governors find the school's budget has been misused. He is succeeded by Rachel Mason (Eva Pope), an ex-prostitute who used to be named Amanda Fenshaw. 

One of the major plots this series is the marriage between two pupils, Chlo Grainger (Katie Griffiths) and Donte Charles (Adam Thomas). Being so young, everybody has their doubts. These doubts are confirmed when Donte finds Chlo sleeping with her sister Mika's (Lauren Drummond) boyfriend, Brett Aspinall (Tom Payne). When Mika tells her she never wants to see her again, Chlo runs away to Manchester, but this only causes more trouble for her and the Graingers, who are already struggling following the death of their mother. Chlo does return to Waterloo Road, but she and Donte's relationship may never be the same. While Mika does rekindle her relationship with Brett, and the pair begin to publicly fight for environmental rights.

Another central character this series is Davina Shackleton (Christine Tremarco), who is accused of having a sexual relationship with pupil, Brett, and who was then forced to date his father. Other storylines included the deportation of a pupil, a plagiarism scam in the school that catches the examination board's attention and English teacher Jasmine Koreshi (Shabana Bakhsh) being accused by new pupil Michaela White (Zaraah Abrahams) of assault. 

The Series 3 finale saw a fire spread throughout the school. During the fire, Davina  was rushed to hospital and headmistress Rachel and contractor, Stuart Hordley (who had both blackmailed Rachel and started the fire) were both trapped under the rubble. Pupil Chlo was trapped in the toilets, but was saved by English teacher Tom Clarkson (Jason Done) and former lover, Donte.

Cast and characters

Staff
 Jason Merrells as Jack Rimmer; Headteacher (7 episodes)
 Neil Morrissey as Eddie Lawson; Deputy Headteacher and Maths teacher (20 episodes)
 Jason Done as Tom Clarkson; Head of Pastoral Care and English teacher (20 episodes)
 Philip Martin Brown as Grantly Budgen; Head of English (20 episodes)
 Christine Tremarco as Davina Shackleton; Teaching Assistant (19 episodes)
 Shabana Bakhsh as Jasmine Koreshi; English teacher (19 episodes)
 Chris Geere as Matt Wilding; Head of Music and Drama (18 episodes)
 Denise Welch as Steph Haydock;  Head of French (18 episodes)
 Jacqueline Kington as Bridget Morley; School secretary (16 episodes)
 Eva Pope as Rachel Mason; Headteacher (14 episodes)
 Kay Purcell as Candice Smilie; Senior Canteen Assistant (9 episodes)
 Craig Fitzpatrick as Lewis Seddon; Canteen Assistant (8 episodes)

Pupils
 Lauren Drummond as Mika Grainger (20 episodes)
 Katie Griffiths as Chlo Grainger (19 episodes)
 Tachia Newall as Bolton Smilie (19 episodes)
 Tom Payne as Brett Aspinall (17 episodes)
 Lauren Thomas as Aleesha Dillon (17 episodes)
 Lucy Dixon as Danielle Harker (17 episodes)
 Adam Thomas as Donte Charles (16 episodes)
 Chelsee Healey as Janeece Bryant (16 episodes)
 Ellie Paskell as Maxine Barlow (16 episodes)
 Jessica Baglow as Karla Bentham (11 episodes)
 Zeriozha Burtt-Skeete as Celine Dixon (9 episodes) 
 Thomas Milner as Paul Langley (8 episodes)
 Zaraah Abrahams as Michaela White (4 episodes)

Others

Recurring
 Silas Carson as Stuart Hordley; Investor and Rachel's blackmailer (9 episodes)
 Chris Finch as Colin Scott; Matt's fiancé (5 episodes)
 Robert Angell as Nigel Hinchcliffe; Chair of Governors (4 episodes)
 Joel Goonan as Dominic Hammond; Pupil (4 episodes)
 Naveed Choudhry as Shahid Kapoor; Pupil (3 episodes)
 Maria Lennon as Ria Cheetham; School governor (3 episodes)
 Lorraine Cheshire as Fleur Budgen; Grantly's wife (2 episodes)
 James Rawlings as Wilson Bingham; Supply teacher (2 episodes)
 Fiona Wade as Sameen Azizi; Pupil (2 episodes)
 Sean Wilson as Darren Briggs, Sr.; Darren's father (2 episodes)
 Lee Worswick as Darren Briggs, Jr.; Pupil (2 episodes)

Guest
 Tara Berwin as Sally Froggart; Pupil (1 episode)
 Antony Edridge as Claude Legard; Investor (1 episode)
 Sally Ann Matthews as Alison Lawson; Eddie's ex-wife (1 episode)
 Steve Money as Clarence Charles; Donte's father (1 episode)
 James Varley as Ben McNulty; Pupil (1 episode)

Production
Waterloo Road was recommissioned by Shed Productions alongside BBC Scotland for a third series consisting of 20 sixty-minute episodes. The series was set in Rochdale, England, with filming based in the same location and starting in 2007. Regularly, music was taken from the London based band Athlete and from their album Beyond the Neighbourhood. Due to copyright issues, some music is unavailable on the DVD release in all regions.

Casting
At the end of series two, a few cast members who had previously received main billing had departed. The third series featured several new cast members, alongside several more departures. Jason Merrells starred in the first six episodes of the third series, before leaving the show. To replace him on-screen in the role of Head of Waterloo Road, Eva Pope was cast as Waterloo Road's newest Head teacher with a past. Andrew Treneman, having played Deputy Head in the first two series, was replaced by Neil Morrissey who was cast in the role of Eddie Lawson. Other new members of staff this series included NQT teacher Jasmine Koreshi (Shabana Bakhsk) and the newly appointed openly gay Head of Music and Drama Matt Wilding (Chris Geere). Pupils introduced in the third series included popular girls Aleesha Dillon (played by Lauren Thomas) and Danielle Harker (played by Lucy Dixon), Karla Bentham (played by Jessica Baglow), who has Asperger syndrome, the troubled Paul Langley (played by Thomas Milner), Bolton Smilie (played by Tachia Newall) and loud and proud pupil Michaela White (played by Zaraah Abrahams).

Episodes

{| class="wikitable plainrowheaders" width="100%"
|-
! style="background-color: #841B2D; color: #FFFFFF;" colspan="8"|Autumn Term
|-
! style="background-color: #841B2D; color: #FFFFFF;" | No.
! style="background-color: #841B2D; color: #FFFFFF;" | Title
! style="background-color: #841B2D; color: #FFFFFF;" | Directed by
! style="background-color: #841B2D; color: #FFFFFF;" | Written by
! style="background-color: #841B2D; color: #FFFFFF;" | Original air date
! style="background-color: #841B2D; color: #FFFFFF;" | UK viewers(million)
|-

|-
! style="background-color: #841B2D; color: #FFFFFF;" colspan="8"|Spring Term
|-

|}

DVD release
Three different box sets of the third series were released. The first ten episodes were released on 2 March 2009, episodes 11–20 were released on 11 May 2009. All twenty episodes were later released together as a complete six-disc set on 24 May 2009. The set included special features titled: Autumn Term Scrap Book, Pupil Reports, Teacher Evaluation and a Spring Term Scrap Book. All box sets for the third series were released with a "12" British Board of Film Classification (BBFC) certificate (meaning it is unsuitable for viewing by those under the age of 12 years).

References

2007 British television seasons
2008 British television seasons
Waterloo Road (TV series)